Dudelange-Burange railway station is a railway station serving the neighbourhood of Burange, in the north of Dudelange, in southern Luxembourg.  It is operated by Chemins de Fer Luxembourgeois, the state-owned railway company.

The station is situated on Line 60, which connects Luxembourg City to the Red Lands of the south of the country.  It is the first station on the branch to the French town of Volmerange-les-Mines.  Dudelange-Burange is one of four railway stations in the city.

External links
 Official CFL page on Dudelange-Burange station
 Rail.lu page on Dudelange-Burange station

Burange railway station
Railway stations on CFL Line 60